Adelia is a genus of flowering plants in the spurge family, Euphorbiaceae, subfamily Acalyphoideae.

Adelia or Adélia may also refer to:

Given name 
Adelia Aguilar, fictional medieval pathologist in books written by Diana Norman under the pen name Ariana Franklin
Adelia Pope Branham (1861–1917), American writer
Adelia Di Carlo (1883–1965), Argentine writer, chronicler, founder
Adelia Sarah Gates (1825–1912), American illustrator of botanical specimens
Adelia Cleopatra Graves (1821–1895), American poet
Adelia Field Johnston (1837–1910), American college professor, dean
Mary Adelia Rosamond McLeod, the first woman Diocesan Bishop in the Episcopal Church
Adélia Prado (born 1935), Brazilian writer and poet
Mary Lua Adelia Davis Treat (1830–1923), naturalist and correspondent with Charles Darwin

Other
Adelia (opera), an 1841 opera in three acts by Gaetano Donizetti
Adelia (cicada), a genus of cicadas

Places 
Santa Adélia, municipality in the state of São Paulo, Brazil
Adelia Land, claimed territory in the continent of Antarctica

See also
Adela (disambiguation)
Adeli (disambiguation)
Adelieae, a tribe of the subfamily Acalyphoideae
Adelina (disambiguation)
Adelita (disambiguation)
Delia